Guy Jackson Hecker (April 3, 1856 – December 3, 1938) was an American pitcher in Major League Baseball.  He was born in Youngsville, Pennsylvania. His debut game took place on May 2, 1882. His final game took place on September 30, 1890. During his career he played for the Louisville Eclipse/Colonels and Pittsburgh Alleghenys. Hecker is considered by some baseball historians to be the best combination pitcher and hitter to play in the 19th century. He remains as one of the only two pitchers in major League history to hit three home runs in one game, alongside Jim Tobin, and the only pitcher to win a batting title. In addition, he is the only pitcher in baseball history to get six hits in a nine-inning game.

Hecker was the second pitcher ever in the American Association to pitch a no-hitter. He did this as a rookie with Louisville on September 19, 1882.  He narrowly missed becoming the first pitcher in the AA by a week, as his teammate Tony Mullane threw one. He also set a WHIP record of 0.77, which remained the MLB record until 2000, when it was broken by Pedro Martínez' mark of 0.74; yet Hecker's mark remains the rookie record. In 1884, Hecker won the pitching version of the triple crown by compiling 52 wins, a 1.85 earned run average, and 385 strikeouts.  In 1886, he won the batting title by hitting .341 for the season.  He finished his career in 1890 by managing and playing for the Pittsburgh Alleghenys.

Hecker died in Wooster, Ohio, and was buried at Wooster Cemetery.

See also
List of Major League Baseball annual wins leaders
List of Major League Baseball annual ERA leaders
List of Major League Baseball annual strikeout leaders
List of Major League Baseball no-hitters
List of Major League Baseball batting champions
List of Major League Baseball single-game hits leaders
List of Major League Baseball player-managers

External links

Article on Hecker

1856 births
1938 deaths
19th-century baseball players
Major League Baseball player-managers
Major League Baseball pitchers
Louisville Eclipse players
Louisville Colonels players
Pittsburgh Pirates players
Minor league baseball managers
Springfield Champion City players
Fort Wayne (minor league baseball) players
Jacksonville Lunatics players
Oil City Oilers players
Baseball players from Pennsylvania